The invasion of France in 1795 or the Battle of Quiberon was a major landing on the Quiberon peninsula by émigré, counter-revolutionary troops in support of the Chouannerie and Vendée Revolt, beginning on 23 June and finally definitively repulsed on 21 July.  It aimed to raise the whole of western France in revolt, bring an end to the French Revolution and restore the French monarchy. The invasion failed; it had a major negative impact, dealing a disastrous blow to the royalist cause.

Preparations
Louis XVIII and the comte d’Artois (the future Charles X of France) divided the counter-revolutionary activities and theatres between them  - to Louis went political generalities and the region from the Alps to the Pyrénées (including Lyon), and to the comte the western provinces (Vendée, Brittany, Normandy).   The comte named Joseph de Puisaye général en chef of Brittany, a good choice since de Puisaye had military talent and political and diplomatic experience.

Playing the English card, Joseph de Puisaye headed the preparations for the expedition to Quiberon but at precisely the same time a Royalist alliance was operating on Louis XVIII's behalf in Paris.  This alliance had a representative in London, through whom they managed to half-discredit Joseph de Puisaye even before the expedition set out and impose a deputy chosen by the alliance, comte Louis Charles d'Hervilly.  The alliance sent d'Hervilly such ambiguous instructions that he was even in a position to contest de Puisaye's orders, or even to claim that it was he, not de Puisaye, who had been given supreme command of the expedition.

Even the chosen landing-point - Brittany - was not unanimously accepted.  Several émigrés preferred a landing in the Vendée, but this was mainly down to François de Charette, who put himself up as a rival to Joseph de Puisaye.  The surrounding of the Île de Quiberon were thus chosen as the landing-point despite their many disadvantages to the invaders - it was only a narrow strip of land, with the shoals blocking access to part of the coasts.  It was also decided to put some of the émigré soldiers in British military uniforms, which proved unwise owing to the Bretons' dislike for the British, and to make up the numbers by using Republican prisoners held on British prison hulks (many of whom would clearly have split loyalties and re-join the Republic forces, seeing as they disliked the British as much as the émigrés).  The comte d'Artois was not even consulted on the choice of date for the expedition, yet it was in his name that Joseph de Puisaye was acting, since the comte d'Artois had theoretically assumed command for all Royalist operations in western France.

The expedition

Naval crossing

On 23 June two squadrons of nine warships (including three ships of the line and two frigates) and 60 troop transports (carrying two divisions of émigrés, totalling 3,500 men, the British 90th Regiment of Foot, 19th Regiment of Foot, 27th Regiment of Foot, as well as muskets, uniforms, shoes, food and supplies for an army of at least 40,000) set out under the command of British admirals Hood and Warren. Villaret-Joyeuse left Brest and attacked Warren's squadron above Îles de Glénan on 23 June 1795, but was forced to retire quickly towards the île de Groix and lost two ships of the line. Linois lost an eye in this encounter, and the British retained naval superiority for the rest of the expedition.

Divisions
On 26 June 1795, the squadrons anchored off Quiberon and could at this point have begun to disembark their troops.  However, it was at this point that comte Louis Charles d'Hervilly took out his letter of nomination and claimed supreme command of the expedition.  The two officers were not even operating the same plan - Puisaye wanted to take advantage of the element of surprise and attack immediately to relieve Royalist troops throughout western France, but d'Hervilly thought the Chouans were undisciplined and incapable of holding out in open battle and so planned to remain at Quiberon, fortifying it for use as a base and for pouring in reinforcements.  The division was not only strategic but political - Puisaye was a former Girondin, favouring the establishment of a constitutional monarchy, whereas d'Hervilly wished for the wholesale reinstatement of the Ancien Régime.  A whole day was lost in heated discussions between the two of them, and a courier was even sent to London to confirm who was to be supreme commander.  Hervilly finally submitted, but the delay lost them the vital element of surprise and allowed the Republican troops of the armée des côtes de Brest to gather themselves, with the émigré troops demonstrating their impatience and astonishment at this inexplicable delay and with their subsequent early successes proving illusory.  As for the Chouan Bretons gathered by Georges Cadoudal, they already suspected a betrayal and the delay only confirmed them in this, with a disastrous effect on morale.

Disembarkation
On the morning of 27 June, the weather cleared after two days of mist and the Republican forces spotted the British ships in Quiberon bay, with the fort at Penthièvre signalling all day to Quiberon, "They are disembarking en grande force."  A British frigate cruised to the eastern point of Belle-Île and a British brig and cutter cruised to its western point, and in the evening another frigate joined the first at the east, anchoring beside it - thus Belle-Île was blockaded.

On 27 June, the British disembarked 8000 troops at Carnac, and summoned Belle-Île to surrender, which it was unwilling to do.  The disembarkation happened without difficulty, since the garrison of Auray had been beaten by the Chouans, who had also taken Carnac, Landévant and Locoal-Mendon, putting the coast in Royalist hands.

Fort Penthièvre, known as Fort Sans-culotte by the Republicans, blocked the route to the north of the island and was held by 700 men of the 41e de ligne (commanded by Delize) but it put up only an insignificant resistance and surrendered on 3 July.  The Royalist troops thus linked up with the Chouans as foreseen and the villages were occupied, but none of the combined force's operations was put into action by Joseph de Puisaye quickly enough to disquiet the Republicans.

Republican counter-attack
Divisions among the Royalist command greatly profited the Republicans, leaving the disembarked troops scattered.  Hoche (then at Vannes) had only 2,000 men under his command but headed for Quiberon, sending for urgent reinforcements en route, and by 4 July had an army of 13,000 men, not having been slowed down by the Chouans in the interior.  In Ille-et-Vilaine, Aimé du Boisguy, with 5,000 men, had enough men to stop Hoche's advance, but he had not even been informed of the landing and was only able to meet him in minor clashes.  On 5 July clashes occurred at Landevant and Auray, with Hoche defeating Chouans under Vauban and Bois-Berthelot.

Lazare Hoche thus arrived at Quiberon unimpeded and turned Carnac into a trap, recapturing it on 6 July and on 7 July re-taking nearly the whole peninsula.  The Chouan divisions placed ahead of Joseph de Puisaye's positions were swept aside, having not been merged into the Royalist divisions.  The comte d'Hervilly did not deign to support them in good time and despite fierce assaults the Republican encirclement could not be broken.

Royalist reaction
On 10 and 11 July, the Royalists launched a plan to break through the Republican lines.  Two Chouan columns, one of 2,500 men under Lantivy and Jean Jan and the other of 3,500 men under Tinténiac and Cadoudal, would embark on British ships and land at Sarzeau.  The Chouans, wearing British uniforms, had the task of attacking the Republican lines from the rear. However, the first column dispersed and the second was ready to attack but was met by chevalier Charles de Margadel with news from the Royalist alliance in Paris of a new landing near Saint-Brieuc and diverted towards the Côtes-d'Armor against Cadoudal's advice. Tinténiac was killed in an ambush on 17 July and no further landing took place to reinforce them.  Angered at this, the Chouans threw off their British uniforms and, led by Cadoudal, managed to evade the Republican troops and get back to their homes.

In the meantime, on 15 July, 2,000 more émigré soldiers, commanded by Charles Eugène Gabriel de Sombreuil landed at Quiberon as reinforcements. The émigrés, then the Chouans, thus launched new offensives but were beaten back, with Louis Charles d'Hervilly mortally wounded in the attack and émigré losses already risen to 1,500 dead.

The assault on Quiberon

Lazare Hoche thus ordered a decisive assault on the night of 20 July against the fort de Penthièvre and its garrison of 4,000 men, despite a violent storm and the fort being covered by the British naval guns.  However, the Republican prisoners brought over as part of the Royalist force deserted and delivered the fort to Hoche by treachery, with many of its defenders being massacred.  The British ships then opened fire on the fort, but their shots landed on Royalist, Republican and civilian alike.  Joseph de Puisaye judged the situation hopeless and ordered his men to re-embark onto the admiral's flagship so as to limit the extent of the Royalist defeat and so, despite his later being accused of deserting to save his own life, 2,500 émigré and Chouan troops were evacuated in British rowing-boats.

Only Sombreuil and his men, cornered as they were, stood in the way of the Republican advance and they put up a last resistance.  However, on the morning of 21 July Hoche and Sombreuil began negotiations and the Royalists capitulated shortly afterwards, apparently with the promise that the lives of all the Royalist troops would be spared.

Massacre of the Royalist prisoners
6,332 Chouans and émigrés were captured, along with members of their family. Lazare Hoche verbally promised that the Royalists would be treated as prisoners of war, but this promise was not kept.  The women and children were freed a few days after the battle, but the soldiers were charged by commissaire Jean-Lambert Tallien. Charles de Virot, Marquis de Sombreuil and 750 of his companions were condemned by a military tribunal and shot by firing squad at Auray. 430 of these were nobles, many of whom had served in the fleet of Louis XVI.  The site of the execution is known as the Champ des martyrs, and those shot there remained buried on the site until 1814. In 1829, an expiatory chapel was built there in the form of a temple.

The Chartreuse at Auray holds the list of prisoners, printed quickly, and a vault with the remains of 952 prisoners from the Royal army who died between 1 and 25 August 1795 after the defeat of the Quiberon landings.

In literature
 One chapter of Mr. Midshipman Hornblower (adapted for television as The Frogs and the Lobsters) was based on this landing.
 In The Black Moon, the fifth novel of the Poldark saga by Winston Graham, Ross Poldark uses the landing to spring his friend Dwight Enys from prison in Quimper.
 The Marquis of Carabas, also known as The Master-at-Arms, by Rafael Sabatini, uses the incident as historical background for this novel.
 The battle of Quiberon is featured in Sir Isumbras at the Ford, a historical novel by D. K. Broster.

Notes

Sources
 Abbé Angot, Quiberon, du 6 juin au 25 juillet 1795, in Revue historique et archéologique du Maine, t. XLI (1897), p. 335-347 
 L'Affaire de Quiberon
 Quiberon in the Napoleonic guide

Battles of the French Revolutionary Wars
Battles involving France
Conflicts in 1795
Military history of Brittany
1795 in France
Invasions of France
France 1795
War of the First Coalition